A Company Secretary is a senior position in a citizen sector establishment. Also known as Compliance Officers, it is one of the positions that is a part of the key managerial personnel (which usually includes the CEO & CFO) of any company. In large American and Canadian publicly listed corporations, a Company Secretary is typically named a Corporate Secretary. A Company Secretary is responsible for the efficient administration of a company, particularly with regard to ensuring compliance with statutory and regulatory requirements and for ensuring that decisions of the board of directors are implemented.

Despite the name, the role is not clerical or secretarial. The company secretary ensures that an organisation complies with relevant legislation and regulation, and keeps board members informed of their legal responsibilities. Company secretaries are the company's named representative on legal documents, and it is their responsibility to ensure that the company and its directors operate within the law. It is also their responsibility to register and communicate with shareholders, to ensure that dividends are paid and to maintain company records, such as lists of directors and shareholders, and annual accounts.

In many countries, private companies have traditionally been required by law to appoint one person as a company secretary, and this person will also usually be a senior board member.

Roles and responsibilities
Company secretaries in all sectors have high level responsibilities including governance structures and mechanisms, corporate conduct within an organisation's regulatory environment, board, shareholder and trustee meetings, compliance with legal, regulatory and listing requirements, the training and induction of non-executives and trustees, contact with regulatory and external bodies, reports and circulars to shareholders/trustees, management of employee benefits such as pensions and employee share schemes, insurance administration and organisation, the negotiation of contracts, risk management, property administration and organisation and the interpretation of financial accounts.

Company secretaries are the primary source of advice on the conduct of business and this can span everything from legal advice on conflicts of interest, through accounting advice on financial reports, to the development of strategy and corporate planning.

Among public companies in North America, providing advice on corporate governance issues is an increasingly important role for corporate secretary. Many shareholders, particularly institutional investors, view sound corporate governance as essential to board and company performance. They are quite vocal in encouraging boards to perform frequent corporate governance reviews and to issue written statements of corporate governance principles. The corporate secretary is usually the executive to assist directors in these efforts, providing information on the practices of other companies, and helping the board to tailor corporate governance principles and practices to fit the board's needs and expectations of investors. In some companies, the role of the corporate secretary as corporate governance adviser has been formalised, with a title such as Chief Governance Officer added to their existing title.

In view of the important roles the company secretary plays in business, PLCs and large companies require the company secretary to be suitably trained, experienced and professionally qualified for these responsibilities.

In the UK, the company secretary may be qualified by virtue of examination and membership of The Chartered Governance Institute (CGI), which is the main qualification specifically for company secretaries. CGI is the body dedicated to the advancement and recognition of professional administration based on a combination of degree-level studies, carefully vetted experience and sponsorship by two people of professional status. Only a person thus qualified is entitled to be designated a 'Chartered Secretary' or 'Chartered Company Secretary'. The Faculty of Secretaries and Administrators founded in 1930 is the second body of corporate secretaries in the United Kingdom and now has a strong emphasis on equality work and governance and its members are designated 'corporate secretaries' or 'certified public secretaries'. It is expected that company secretaries of publicly quoted companies will be professionally qualified through CGI, one of the chartered professional bodies in the accountancy profession, or have appropriate training and experience through another body.

Malaysia 
In Malaysia, the Companies Act 2016  requires that every company to appoint at least one secretary. The secretary has to be appointed within the first 30 days after incorporation or a penalty is imposed on the Directors, running into a risk of being blacklisted. The responsibilities of the secretary include the following:
 Preparing board meetings and the Annual General Meeting (AGM) - As of year 2016 under the revised Companies Act, AGM is no longer necessary for Private Limited Companies (Sendirian Berhad or Sdn Bhd)
 Filing Annual returns to SSM (CCM in English)
 Amendments to the company Constitution
 Maintaining statutory documents
 Filing updates with SSM on matters such as changes of company name or address, issue of shares, changes in directors, shareholders, etc.
Only an individual who satisfies the requirement in the Companies Act 2016, section 235 (2) may be appointed a company secretary. The only professional body in Malaysia that awards the Chartered Secretary (FCIS/ACIS) qualification is the Malaysian Institute of Chartered Secretaries and Administrators (MAICSA), which is a division of the Chartered Governance Institute, United Kingdom. In addition to the qualifications specified in the Companies Act 2016, section 235 (2), a company secretary must also hold a current practising certificate issued by the Companies Commission of Malaysia (Suruhanjaya Syarikat Malaysia).

India 

In India, "The Institute of Company Secretaries of India" (ICSI) regulates the profession of company secretaries . ICSI is a statutory professional body which has more than 65,000 associate members.

Chartered Secretaries are employed as chairs, chief executives and non-executive directors, as well as executives and company secretaries.  Some chartered secretaries are also known in their own companies as corporate secretarial executives/managers or corporate secretarial directors.

Many corporate secretaries of North American public companies are lawyers and some serve as their corporation's general counsel. While this can be helpful in the execution of their duties it can also create ambiguity as to what is legal advice, protected by privilege, and what is business advice.

United Kingdom
Since 8 April 2008 there has been no legal requirement for a private company in the UK to have a company secretary unless the company's articles of association state otherwise. If a private company doesn't have a company secretary then the company secretarial duties and responsibilities fall upon the directors of the company. With the increase in the number of social enterprises and community interest companies there is often a demand for a company secretary in the voluntary and community sectors as well as ordinary private trading companies. A public company in the UK must still have a formally appointed company secretary.

Chartered Secretaries are the sixth highest paid employees in the UK according to the Office for National Statistics Annual Survey of Hours and Earnings (March 2010).

The exact responsibilities of the company secretary depend on the size and nature of the company and there is no statutory definition of what these are, but it generally includes some or all of the following:

 maintaining the company's statutory registers;
 updating the records held by Companies House;
 maintaining the company's registered office;
 advising the board of directors on their legal and corporate responsibilities and matters of corporate governance;
 organizing the company’s board meetings and annual general meeting;
 minuting board meetings;
 ensuring company compliance with legal obligations;  
 managing and storing the company's records, e.g. re investments, property, payroll, insurance, accounting, taxation (VAT, PAYE, Corporation Tax); and
 liaison between the company and its stakeholders and shareholders

Singapore
In Singapore, The Companies Act, Section 171  requires that every business has a Company Secretary that must reside in Singapore. The Secretary has to be appointed within the first 6 months after incorporation. If the company has only one director, he or she cannot be the Corporate Secretary. The responsibilities of the Corporate Secretary include the following:

 Preparing board meetings and the Annual General Meeting
 Filing Annual returns to ACRA
 Amendments to the company Constitution
 Maintaining statutory registers
 Filing updates with ACRA on matters such as changes of company name or address, issue of shares, changes in directors, shareholders, etc.
For public companies, the Secretary must be a registered filing agent or a qualified individual.

Bangladesh

China 
In China, every listed company is required to have a board secretary. According to article 124 of 2005 Company Law, every listed company is required to have a secretary to the board of directors. The responsibilities of board secretary include preparing meetings of shareholders and boards of directors, maintaining company records and shareholders information, dealing with information disclosure etc. Relevant listing rules in China further clarify that the secretary of the Board is a managerial position. Such listing rules discuss duties of board secretary in details. According to "Special Provisions of the State Council Concerning the Flotation and Listing Abroad of Stocks by Limited Stock Companies", "Guidance for the Articles of Listed Company", "Stock Listing Rules of the Shanghai Stock Exchange" and "Stock Listing Rules of the Shenzhen Stock Exchange", the secretary of the Board is classified as the senior management team. From those listing rules, the board secretary, or the secretary of the board of directors, in China is comparable as the company secretary in many other countries.

South Africa
In South Africa, all public and state-owned company must appoint a company secretary. The roles and responsibilities of the company secretary are defined in the Companies Act, No 71 of 2008. For publicly listed companies, these roles were clarified and expanded by the King IV report. In addition, non-profit companies that have voluntarily adopted the "Enhanced Accountability and Transparency" provisions of the Companies Act must appoint a company secretary whose role is comparable to that of a public company.

Sri Lanka 
In Sri Lanka, the Companies Act, No. 07 of 2007 requires that each registered company has a company secretary. A company secretary is required to be registered with the Department of Registrar of Companies, to function as a company secretary. Eligibility to function as a secretary are;

Sri Lankan citizen
An [Attorney at law], a [Chartered Accountant] or any person demanded have followed a program of study by the Subject Minister
Applicants with over 20 years experience in the company secretaries field may be appointed after an interview with the Registrar of Companies.

References

External links
 Canadian Society of Corporate Secretaries (Canada)
 Corporate Secretaries International Association
 The Society of Corporate Secretaries & Governance Professionals (North America)
 Chartered Secretaries Canada
 The Hong Kong Institute of Chartered Secretaries
 The Institute of Company Secretaries Of India
 The Institute of Chartered Secretaries and Administrators, UK
 The Faculty of Secretaries and Administrators, UK
 Institute of Corporate secretaries of Pakistan
 Governance Institute of Australia

Legal professions
Company secretaries